Full Frontal may refer to:

 Full Frontal (play), a 1979 play by Michael Hastings
 Full Frontal (Australian TV series), an Australian sketch comedy series which debuted in 1993
 Full Frontal (film), a 2002 film by Steven Soderbergh
 Full frontal nudity as a state of nudity in general
 Full Frontal with Samantha Bee, an American news satire series on TBS
 Full Frontal, a 2001 film by Kyle Schickner
 Full Frontal, a character from Mobile Suit Gundam Unicorn
 "Full Frontal Nudity", the eighth episode of the first series of Monty Python's Flying Circus